The Trois-Rivières Lions were an ice hockey team in Trois-Rivières, Quebec. They played in the Quebec Hockey League from 1955 to 1959, and the Eastern Professional Hockey League for the 1960 season.

Results

External links 
 The Internet Hockey Database

1955 establishments in Quebec
1960 disestablishments in Quebec
Eastern Professional Hockey League (2008–09) teams
Ice hockey clubs established in 1955
Ice hockey teams in Quebec
Sport in Trois-Rivières
Sports clubs disestablished in 1960